The Sir Barton Stakes is an American ungraded Thoroughbred horse race for three-year-olds over a distance of  miles held at Pimlico Race Course in Baltimore, Maryland. The race offers a purse of $100,000.

It is run as part of the undercard for the Preakness Stakes, the second leg of the U.S. Triple Crown series.

History 

The race is named for the U.S. Racing Hall of Fame colt Sir Barton, who was the 1st U.S. Triple Crown Champion.

The 8.5-furlong ungraded stakes race was renamed from 2007–2008 for the 2006 Kentucky Derby winner, Barbaro, who suffered an injury in the 2006 Preakness Stakes that ultimately cost him his life.

Records 
 
Speed record: 
  miles - 1:41.67 - Fame and Power (2015) 

Most wins by an owner:
 2 - R. Larry Johnson (1995, 1997)
 2 - Paraneck Stable (1996, 2009)

Most wins by a jockey:
 3 - Edgar Prado (1997, 2002, 2003)

Most wins by a trainer:
 4 - H. Graham Motion (1995, 1997, 2000, 2017)
 4 - Nick Zito (1996, 2004, 2005, 2009)

Winners of the Sir Barton Stakes since 1993 

Note:
 †Dead Heat

See also 
 Sir Barton Stakes top three finishers and starters
 List of graded stakes at Pimlico Race Course

References 

 Barbaro Stakes at Pedigree Query

Listed stakes races in the United States
Sports competitions in Baltimore
1993 establishments in Maryland
Flat horse races for three-year-olds
Pimlico Race Course
Horse races in Maryland
Recurring sporting events established in 1993